Leu is a commune in Dolj County, Oltenia, Romania with a population of 5,468 people. It is composed of two villages, Leu and Zănoaga.

References 

Communes in Dolj County
Localities in Oltenia